Federico Damián Alonso del Monte (born 4 April 1991) is an Uruguayan professional footballer who plays as a centre-back for Peruvian club Cusco FC.

References

External links
 
 Federico Damian Alonso at Liga MX

1991 births
Living people
Uruguayan footballers
Footballers from Montevideo
Association football defenders
Club Atlético River Plate (Montevideo) players
Villa Teresa players
S.D. Aucas footballers
Fuerza Amarilla S.C. footballers
Murciélagos FC footballers
Atlético Venezuela C.F. players
C.A. Cerro players
Club Universitario de Deportes footballers
Uruguayan Primera División players
Uruguayan Segunda División players
Ecuadorian Serie A players
Ecuadorian Serie B players
Ascenso MX players
Venezuelan Primera División players
Peruvian Primera División players
Uruguayan expatriate footballers
Expatriate footballers in Ecuador
Uruguayan expatriate sportspeople in Ecuador
Expatriate footballers in Mexico
Uruguayan expatriate sportspeople in Mexico
Expatriate footballers in Venezuela
Uruguayan expatriate sportspeople in Venezuela
Expatriate footballers in Peru
Uruguayan expatriate sportspeople in Peru